Submarine Squadron 19 (also known as SUBRON 19) is a squadron of submarines of the United States Navy based in Bangor, Washington under the command of Captain Richard Massie. The submarines that make up SUBRON 19 include:
 
 
 
In addition to the boats listed, SUBRON 19 includes all SSBNs and fast attack submarines (SSNs) undergoing maintenance in the Puget Sound Naval Shipyard and Intermediate Maintenance Facility.

Notes

See also
 History of the United States Navy

External links
  Official webpage.

Submarine squadrons of the United States Navy